A vise (also spelled vice) is a mechanical screw apparatus.

Vise, Visé or VISE may also refer to:

Places
 Visé, Belgium

People
People with the surname Vise:
 Brittany Vise (born 1987), retired American pair skater
 David A. Vise (21st century), American journalist
 Hollie Vise (born 1987), American gymnast
 Tiffany Vise (born 1986), American pair skater

Other uses
 The Vise, an anthology mystery television series, aired 1954–1955
 The Vise (1955 TV series), also The Vise: Mark Saber, a mystery drama television series
 Miami Vise, a defunct AFL team
 Venus In-Situ Explorer (VISE), a space probe

See also
 Vice (disambiguation)